The USA men's national under-17 basketball team, is controlled by USA Basketball, and represents the United States in international under-17 and under-16 (aged 17 and under) basketball competitions.

Competitive record

FIBA Under-17 World Championship

FIBA Americas Under-16 Championship

See also
 United States men's national basketball team
 United States men's national under-19 basketball team
 United States women's national basketball team
 United States women's national under-19 basketball team
 United States women's national under-17 basketball team
 United States men's national 3x3 team

References

External links

Men's national under-17 basketball teams
United States national youth basketball teams